The 20th Logistics Battalion was a logistics battalion in the Land Component of the Belgian Armed Forces.

Logistics Battalion, 20
Military logistics of Belgium
Military units and formations established in 1951
1951 establishments in Belgium